El Gordo is Spanish for "the fat one" or "the big one", and may refer to:

Lottery prizes
 An alternative name for the Spanish Christmas Lottery as well as the name of its largest prize.
 El Gordo de la Primitiva, a Weekly Public lottery in Spain

Places
 El Gordo (galaxy cluster), a very large distant galaxy cluster
 El Gordo, Cáceres, Spain, a municipality

People
 Henry I of Navarre (1244–1274), King of Navarre, called in Spanish Enrique el Gordo
 Raúl De Molina (born 1959), nicknamed "El Gordo", co-host of the entertainment news show El Gordo y la Flaca
 El Gordo, the nickname of one of Pablo Escobar's men, discussed in Sebastián Marroquín's book Pablo Escobar: My Father (2014)
 "El Gordo," nickname of Nicolás Sierra Santana, the leader of the Mexican criminal organization Los Viagras

See also
 
 
 Gordo (disambiguation)